The 1985 Baltimore Orioles season was a season in American baseball. It involved the Orioles finishing 4th in the American League East with a record of 83 wins and 78 losses. The Orioles led Major League Baseball in home runs (214) and slugging percentage (.430).

Offseason
 October 2, 1984: Tom Underwood was released by the Baltimore Orioles.
 December 13, 1984: Don Aase was signed as a free agent by the Orioles.
 December 17, 1984: Ron Jackson was released by the Orioles.
 January 3, 1985: Mike Blowers was drafted by the Orioles in the 4th round of the 1985 Major League Baseball Draft (Secondary Phase), but did not sign.
 February 7, 1985: Vic Rodriguez was traded by the Orioles to the San Diego Padres for Fritzie Connally.
 March 27, 1985: Mark Brown was traded by the Orioles to the Minnesota Twins for Brad Havens.
 March 29, 1985: Todd Cruz was released by the Orioles.

Regular season

Season standings

Record vs. opponents

Opening Day starters
Rich Dauer
Storm Davis
Rick Dempsey
Wayne Gross
John Lowenstein
Fred Lynn
Eddie Murray
Cal Ripken Jr.
Larry Sheets
Mike Young

Notable transactions
 June 3, 1985: Rico Rossy was drafted by the Orioles in the 33rd round of the 1985 Major League Baseball Draft. Player signed June 6, 1985.

Roster

Player stats

Batting

Starters by position
Note: Pos = Position; G = Games played; AB = At bats; H = Hits; Avg. = Batting average; HR = Home runs; RBI = Runs batted in

Other batters
Note: G = Games played; AB = At bats; H = Hits; Avg. = Batting average; HR = Home runs; RBI = Runs batted in

Pitching

Starting pitchers
Note: G = Games pitched; IP = Innings pitched; W = Wins; L = Losses; ERA = Earned run average; SO = Strikeouts

Other pitchers
Note: G = Games pitched; IP = Innings pitched; W = Wins; L = Losses; ERA = Earned run average; SO = Strikeouts

Relief pitchers
Note: G = Games pitched; W = Wins; L = Losses; SV = Saves; ERA = Earned run average; SO = Strikeouts

Farm system 

Daytona Beach affiliation shared with Texas Rangers

Notes

References 
1985 Baltimore Orioles team page at Baseball Reference
1985 Baltimore Orioles season at baseball-almanac.com

Baltimore Orioles seasons
Baltimore Orioles season
Baltimore Orioles